Tian Yuda (born 26 November 2001) is a Chinese professional footballer who currently plays for Chinese Super League club Beijing Guoan.

Club career
Tian Yuda would play for the Shandong Taishan youth team before being loaned out to second tier club Beijing BSU on 25 February 2019. He would make his debut in a Chinese FA Cup game against Shenzhen Pengcheng on 17 April 2019 in a 5-1 victory where he came on as a late substitute. The following season he would be loaned out to third tier club Hebei Zhuoao before joining Beijing BSU once again on another loan. He would go on to personally have his breakout season by immediately establishing within the team with 25 league appearances and scoring five goals.

On 22 April 2022, Tian joined Chinese Super League club Beijing Guoan. He would go on to make his debut in a league game on 14 September 2022 against Hebei F.C. in a 3-1 victory.

Career statistics

Club
.

References

External links

2001 births
Living people
Chinese footballers
China youth international footballers
Association football forwards
China League Two players
China League One players
Chinese Super League players
Shandong Taishan F.C. players
Beijing Sport University F.C. players
Beijing Guoan F.C. players